Caroline Adrien (born 23 December 1987) is a French professional kite surfer.

In July 2012 she won the silver medal in the Slalom World Championships, finishing behind Katja Roose, but in front of Kristin Boese.

Achievements
Source:
2010
 PKRA World Tour Thailand (cross race)
 PKRA World Tour Sankt Peter-Ording (cross race)
 PKRA World Tour Fuerteventura (cross race)
 PKRA World Tour Bariloche (cross race)
2011
 PKRA World Tour Thailand (cross race)
 PKRA World Tour (cross race)
 PKRA World Tour Sankt Peter-Ording (cross race)
 World Championships (slalom)
2012
 PKRA World Tour Hyères (cross race)
 World Championships (slalom)

References

External links
PKRA Profile

1987 births
Living people
French kitesurfers
Female kitesurfers
French sportswomen